Stability may refer to:

Mathematics
Stability theory, the study of the stability of solutions to differential equations and dynamical systems
Asymptotic stability
Linear stability
Lyapunov stability
Orbital stability
Structural stability
Stability (probability), a property of probability distributions
Stability (learning theory), a property of machine learning algorithms
Stability, a property of sorting algorithms
Numerical stability, a property of numerical algorithms which describes how errors in the input data propagate through the algorithm
Stability radius, a property of continuous polynomial functions
Stable theory, concerned with the notion of stability in model theory
Stability, a property of points in geometric invariant theory
K-Stability, a stability condition for algebraic varieties.
Bridgeland stability conditions, a class of stability conditions on elements of a triangulated category.
Stability (algebraic geometry)

Engineering
In atmospheric fluid dynamics, atmospheric stability, a measure of the turbulence in the ambient atmosphere
BIBO stability (Bounded Input, Bounded Output stability), in signal processing and control theory
Directional stability, the tendency for a body moving with respect to a medium to point in the direction of motion
Elastic stability, the resistance of a structural member to buckling
Flight dynamics, including longitudinal stability
Nyquist stability criterion, defining the limits of stability for pole-zero analysis in control systems
Relaxed stability, the property of inherently unstable aircraft
Ship stability in naval architecture includes
Limit of positive stability, the angle at which a boat will no longer stay upright
Stability conditions (watercraft) of waterborne vessels
Slope stability, a property of soil-covered slopes
Stability Model of software design

Natural sciences
Band of stability, in physics, the scatter distribution of isotopes that do not decay
Chemical stability, occurring when a substance is in a dynamic chemical equilibrium with its environment
Thermal stability of a chemical compound
Kinetic stability of a chemical compound
Stability constants of complexes, in solution
Convective instability, a fluid dynamics condition
Ecological stability, measure of the probability of a population returning quickly to a previous state, or not going extinct
Plasma stability, a measure of how likely a perturbation in a plasma is to be damped out

Exercise and sports medicine
Core stability of the abdominal muscles
Joint stability in the musculoskeletal system

Social sciences
Economic stability, the absence of excessive fluctuations in the macroeconomy
Hegemonic stability theory, a theory of international relations
Mertens-stable equilibrium, called "stability" in game theory

Entertainment
The Stability EP, a 2002 three song EP by Death Cab for Cutie
"Stability", a song by Debbie Harry from the album Debravation
"Stability" (short story), by Philip K. Dick

Other uses
 Stability (wine)

See also
Balance (disambiguation)
Bicycle and motorcycle dynamics
Equilibrium (disambiguation)
Fault-tolerant system
Homeostasis, a property of a system in which variables are regulated so that internal conditions remain stable
Instability
Stabilizer (disambiguation)
Stable (disambiguation)
List of types of equilibrium